The March Route of Rochambeau's Army: Bailey Road is a section of abandoned roadway that is a historic site in Bolton, Connecticut.  It was listed on the National Register of Historic Places in 2003.  The roadway is one of the most intact sections in Connecticut of the march route taken by French troops under the command of the Count de Rochambeau in 1781.

Description and history
The Bailey Road portion of the Rochambeau Route is accessed via Bailey Road off United States Route 6 in western Andover. This now-abandoned stretch of road originally extended all the way to Brandy Street in Bolton, north of the location of Bolton High School. It extends in a generally east-west direction, but winds to follow the terrain, and eventually ascends a steep ridge. Both sides of the road were historically lined with stone walls; that on the south side is now in better condition than that to the north. There are two short stone slab bridges along this road section, which are little more than stone slab box culverts. Unlike many other surviving Rochambeau Route segments, this one is completely devoid of subsequent development.

French chroniclers of the Rochambeau army's trek were highly critical of the road conditions in Connecticut.  They described the route between their fourth and fifth camps (Windham and Bolton, respectively) as being "frightful", with "mountains and steep ridges", that one writer said they traversed "with the greatest difficulty imaginable".  The road was originally laid out in 1710, and was in the 1790s bypassed by more suitable routes.  By the time of World War II, the road segment had been entirely abandoned.  Research done in preparation for the march's 200th anniversary identified the road section, in part by the presence of surviving period homes near either end.  The eastern end is now marked by an interpretive sign.

See also
March Route of Rochambeau's army
List of historic sites preserved along Rochambeau's route
National Register of Historic Places listings in Tolland County, Connecticut

References

Roads on the National Register of Historic Places in Connecticut
Historic districts in Tolland County, Connecticut
Bolton, Connecticut
Historic places on the Washington–Rochambeau Revolutionary Route
National Register of Historic Places in Tolland County, Connecticut
Connecticut in the American Revolution
American Revolution on the National Register of Historic Places